Darrell Philip Grierson (born 13 October 1968) is an English footballer, who played as a goalkeeper in the Football League for Tranmere Rovers.

References

External links

Tranmere Rovers F.C. players
Association football goalkeepers
English Football League players
1968 births
Living people
English footballers